Plagiotremus laudandus, the bicolour fangblenny, false harptail-blenny, poison-fang blenny mimic, yellow-tailed blenny or the yellowtail fangblenny mimic, is a species of combtooth blenny found in coral reefs in the western Pacific ocean.  This species reaches a length of  TL. This species is a Batesian mimic of Meiacanthus atrodorsalis.

References

External links
 

laudandus
Taxa named by Gilbert Percy Whitley
Fish described in 1961

sv:Plagiotremus laudandus